William Francis McNulty (born August 29, 1946) is a retired Major League Baseball player. During his major league career, he played in the outfield and at third base.

External links
Baseball Reference
Baseball Reference (Minors)
Retrosheet
Pura Pelota
 

1946 births
Living people
American expatriate baseball players in Japan
Arizona Instructional League Athletics players
Baseball players from Sacramento, California
Birmingham A's players
Burlington Bees players
Evansville Triplets players
Leesburg A's players
Iowa Oaks players
Lotte Orions players
Major League Baseball first basemen
Major League Baseball third basemen
Major League Baseball left fielders
Mobile A's players
Oakland Athletics players
Peninsula Grays players
Sacramento Solons players
Tidewater Tides players
Tigres de Aragua players
American expatriate baseball players in Venezuela